The discography of Dutch DJ, musician, record producer and composer San Holo consists of two studio albums, eight extended plays, forty-one singles, five production-credited songs, and nineteen remixes.

In 2016, Holo's single "Light" peaked at 13 on the US Dance charts, and is certified Gold in the United States, Holo's first single to do so. He would return to the charts with "The Future" at 50, "Lift Me from the Ground" at 39, and "Brighter Days" at 49. Holo's debut album, Album1, includes "Show Me", which peaked at 42 on the Dance/Electronic Songs charts in 2018.

In the Netherlands, "I Still See Your Face" peaked at 29 on the Dutch Top 40.

Studio albums

Extended plays

Singles

As featured artist

Other charted songs

Remixes

References 

Electronic music discographies
Discographies of Dutch artists